The monarchy of Cambodia is the head of state of the Kingdom of Cambodia. In the contemporary period, the King's power has been limited to that of a symbolic figurehead. The monarchy had been in existence since at least 68 AD except during its abolition from 1970 to 1993. Since 1993, the King of Cambodia has been an elected monarch, making Cambodia one of the few elective monarchies of the world. The king is elected for life by the Royal Council of the Throne, which consists of several senior political and religious figures. Candidates are chosen from among male descendants of King Ang Duong who are at least 30 years old, from the two royal houses of Cambodia (the House of Norodom and the House of Sisowath).

Role
Cambodia's constitution, promulgated in 1993 stipulated the king's role as a mainly ceremonial one. It declared that the king "shall reign, but not govern" as well as being the "symbol of national unity and continuity". 
 
The king performs important functions of state as required by the constitution. This includes but is not limited to:
 
Appointing the Prime Minister of Cambodia and the Cabinet of Cambodia.
Convening over the opening of the two legislative bodies, the National Assembly of Cambodia and the Senate of Cambodia.
Serving as the Supreme Commander of the Royal Cambodian Armed Forces.
Meeting with the Prime Minister on a semi-monthly basis in which the King is briefed on matters of state.
Signing the royal code/decree that gives effect to laws enacted by the legislature and proposals by the cabinet.
Acting as "supreme arbiter" to enable the functioning of state institutions.
Receiving credentials from ambassadors.
Possessing the power of commutation and pardon.
Presiding over the Supreme Council of the Magistracy.
Appointing a fixed number of members to serve on state institutions such as the Senate and the Constitutional Council.
Awarding of national honours.

The king also fulfils other roles not explicitly mentioned in the constitution in his capacity as head of state, for example, presiding over events of national significance including religious ceremonies and traditions integral to the Khmer nation, supporting humanitarian and philanthropic causes, and representing Cambodia abroad when undertaking official visits overseas. Although there have been female rulers in the past, the 1993 constitution currently forbids women from succeeding to the throne.

Ministry of the Royal Palace

The Ministry of the Royal Palace, currently overseen by Minister Kong Sam Ol in conjunction with the Supreme Privy Advisory Council, formerly headed by the King's half-brother Prince Norodom Ranariddh assists and advises the king accordingly in carrying out his duties as monarch.

Mythological history
Sage Kambu Swayambhuva

Early period (68–1431)

Funan (68–627)

Chenla (550–802)

Khmer Empire (802–1431)

Middle Period (1431–1863)

Chaktomuk period (1431–1525)

Longvek period (1525–1594)

Srei Santhor Era (1594–1620)

Oudong period (1620–1863)

Modern period (1863–present)

French protectorate of Cambodia (1863–1953)

First Kingdom of Cambodia (1953–1970)

Second Kingdom of Cambodia (1993–present)

Royal symbols

See also
Monarchs' family tree
List of heads of state of Cambodia
Prime Minister of Cambodia
List of prime ministers of Cambodia
Devaraja
Abolition of monarchy

Notes

References

External links

"$1 million royal gift for Kantha Bopha" in Khmer Times
"Cambodia marks beginning of farming season with royal ploughing ceremony" in Xinhuanet
"Cambodian king, PM wrap up annual Water Festival" in Xinhuanet

"President Xi meets Cambodian king in Beijing" in GB Times

 
Lists of monarchs
Lists of Cambodian people by occupation